Harley and Rose is the sixth studio album by Australian rock band The Black Sorrows. The album was released in September 1990 and peaked at number three on the ARIA Charts, becoming the band's first top five album. The album remained in the top 50 for 51 weeks.

At the ARIA Music Awards of 1991, the album was nominated for two ARIA Awards; ARIA Award for Album of the Year and ARIA Award for Best Group but lost to Blue Sky Mining by Midnight Oil for both awards.

Critical reception

Tom Demalon of AllMusic felt that although "rooted in country, folk, and blues ... the band doesn't allow themselves to be stuck in any one genre and they flirt from one style to another, enthusiastically anchored only by the literate songwriting and tight musicianship displayed throughout".

Track listing
CD (CBS – 467133 2)
(All track written by Joe Camilleri and Nick Smith except where noted. 
 "Harley + Rose" – 3:54
 "Never Let Me Go" – 4:03
 "Love Goes Wild" – 3:25
 "Hold It Up to the Mirror" – 5:43
 "Carried by the Light" – 4:45
 "Angel Street" – 3:55
 "Tears for the Bride" – 4:03
 "Small Changes" – 4:01
 "Soul on Fire" – 5:56
 "Calling Card" (Burt) – 4:34
 "Cannonball Cafe" – 3:54
 "Rise and Fall" – 3:50
 "House of Light" – 5:01
 "Baby It's a Crime" – 3:55
 "Deadline Blues" – 3:16
 "Lay Your Head Down" – 4:48

Vinyl (CBS 467133 1)
Side A
 "Harley + Rose" – 3:54	
 "Never Let Me Go" – 4:03	
 "Love Goes Wild" – 3:25	
 "Hold It Up to the Mirror" – 5:43	
 "Angel Street" – 3:55	
Side B
 "Soul on Fire" – 5:56	
 "Carried by the Light" – 4:45	
 "House of Light" – 5:01	
 "Tears for the Bride" – 4:03	
 "Cannonball Cafe" – 3:54

Personnel
 Accordion – George Butrumlis
 Bass – Richard Sega, Joe Creighton, Stephen Hadley
 Congas – Alex Pertout
 Drums, percussion – Peter Luscombe
 Electric guitar – Ross Hannaford
 Guitar – Wayne Burt
 Guitar, mandolin – Jeffrey Burstin, Sam See, Phil Butson
 Harmonica – Anthony Harkin
 Horns – The Brasstards
 Lead vocals, harmony vocals – Vika and Linda Bull
 Hammond organ, piano, Harmonium, guitar, sitar – James Black 
 Piano – Paul Grabowsky
 Steel guitar – Lucky Oceans
 Strings – Gabby O'Halloran, Stephen McTaggart
 Tin whistle – Dobe Newton
 Trumpet – Peter Bishop
 Violin – Jen Anderson, Danny Bourke
 Harmony vocals – Venetta Fields, Joe Creighton
 Vocals, saxophone, guitar, Hammond organ – Joe Camilleri

Charts

Weekly charts

Year-end chart

Certifications

References

External links
 "Harley and Rose" at discogs.com

1990 albums
The Black Sorrows albums
CBS Records albums
Albums produced by Joe Camilleri